The 2013–14 season was Parma Football Club's 23rd season in Serie A and their 5th consecutive season in the top-flight of Italian football, after having been promoted from Serie B in 2009–10. The club enjoyed one of their best seasons in recent years, finishing 6th.

Players

Squad information

Competitions

Serie A

League table

Results summary

Results by round

Matches

Coppa Italia

Statistics

Appearances and goals

|-
! colspan=10 style="background:#dcdcdc; text-align:center"| Goalkeepers

|-
! colspan=10 style="background:#dcdcdc; text-align:center"| Defenders

|-
! colspan=10 style="background:#dcdcdc; text-align:center"| Midfielders

|-
! colspan=10 style="background:#dcdcdc; text-align:center"| Forwards

|-
! colspan=10 style="background:#dcdcdc; text-align:center"| Players transferred out during the season

Goalscorers

Clean sheets

Disciplinary record

References

Parma Calcio 1913 seasons
Parma